McDermott or MacDermott is an Irish surname from County Roscommon and is mostly found in the west of Ireland. Some notable people with the surname are listed below.

Surname

A
Alan McDermott (born 1982), Irish footballer
Alice McDermott (born 1953), American writer
Alister McDermott (born 1991), Australian cricketer
Allan Langdon McDermott (1854–1908), American politician
Andrew McDermott (disambiguation), multiple people
Ann McDermott, American biophysicist
Anne-Marie McDermott, American pianist
Ardal McDermott, Irish hurler

B
Barrie McDermott (born 1972), English rugby union footballer
Ben McDermott (born 1994), Australian cricketer
Beverly McDermott (1926–2012), American director
Bill McDermott (born 1961), American business executive
Bob McDermott (born 1963), American politician
Bobby McDermott (1914–1963), American basketball player
Bosco McDermott (born 1936), Irish sportsperson
Brett McDermott, English mixed martial artist
Brian McDermott (disambiguation), multiple people

C
Catherine McDermott, British professor
Charles McDermott (disambiguation), multiple people
Chris McDermott (born 1963), Australian rules footballer
Christopher McDermott (born 1989), British handball player and coach
Clancy McDermott (1920–2007), Northern Irish footballer
Conor McDermott (born 1992), American football player
Cormac MacDermott (? – 1618), one of the best-known Irish harpers at the Jacobean court
Craig McDermott (born 1965), Australian cricketer

D
Darren McDermott (born 1978), English boxer
Dave McDermott (born 1974), American artist
David McDermott (born 1988), English footballer
Dean McDermott (born 1966), Canadian-American actor
Dennis McDermott (1922–2003), Canadian trade unionist
Don McDermott (1929–2020), American speed skater
Donal McDermott (born 1989), Irish footballer
Doug McDermott (born 1992), American basketball player
Drew McDermott (born 1949), American computer scientist
Dylan McDermott (born 1961), American actor

E
Edward J. McDermott (1952–1926), American politician
Elizabeth McDermott, British professor
Emmet McDermott (1911–2002), Australian politician and dentist
Enda McDermott (born 1945), Irish cricketer
Eoghan McDermott (born 1983), Irish television presenter
Erica McDermott (born 1973), American actress
Eugene McDermott (1899–1973), American geophysicist

F
Fran McDermott (born 1960), American football player
Francis McDermott (1874–1957), Australian politician
Frank McDermott (disambiguation), multiple people

G
Gary McDermott (born 1946), American football player
George Thomas McDermott (1886–1937), American judge
Gerald McDermott (1941–2012), American filmmaker
Gertrude McDermott (1846–1940), American teacher and religious figure
Greg McDermott (born 1964), American basketball coach
Gregory McDermott (born 1958), Australian equestrian

H
Helen McDermott (born 1954), British radio and television presenter
Hugh McDermott (disambiguation), multiple people

J
Jack McDermott (1906–1958), Irish trade unionist
James McDermott (disambiguation), multiple people
Jerry McDermott, American police officer
J. M. McDermott, American writer
John McDermott (disambiguation), multiple people
Joseph McDermott (disambiguation), multiple people
Josie McDermott (1925–1992), Irish musician

K
Kathleen McDermott (born 1977), Scottish actress
Kathleen McDermott (psychologist), American psychologist
K. C. McDermott (born 1996), American football player
Keith McDermott (born 1953), American actor
Kevin McDermott (disambiguation), multiple people
Kirstyn McDermott, Australian writer

L
Lee McDermott (gymnast) (born 1974), British gymnast
Luke McDermott (born 1987), American ice sled hockey player
Lloyd McDermott (1939–2019), Australian rugby union footballer

M
Marc McDermott (1871–1929), Australian actor
Marcia McDermott (born 1965), American soccer coach
Mark McDermott (born 1971), Irish rugby union footballer
Martin McDermott, Irish Gaelic footballer and manager
Mary McDermott ( 1832), Irish poet
Mary M. McDermott, American professor
Matthew McDermott (born 1977), American judge
Maurice McDermott (footballer) (1923–1988), English footballer
Melissa McDermott, American news anchor and reporter
Michael McDermott (disambiguation), multiple people
Mick McDermott (born 1974), Northern Irish footballer
Mickey McDermott (1929–2003), American baseball player
Mike McDermott (disambiguation), multiple people
Murray McDermott (1950–2003), Scottish footballer

N
Neale McDermott (born 1985), English footballer
Neil McDermott (born 1980), British actor
Nicola McDermott (born 1996), Australian high jumper
Nora McDermott (1927–2013), Canadian basketball and volleyball player
Norm McDermott (1913–1987), Australian rules footballer

P
Patrick McDermott (disambiguation), multiple people
Paul McDermott (disambiguation), multiple people
Peter McDermott (disambiguation), multiple people
Phelim McDermott (born 1963), English actor and stage director
Phil McDermott, British actor

R
Red McDermott (1888–1964), American baseball player
Robert McDermott (disambiguation), multiple people
Rose McDermott, American professor

S
Sandy McDermott (1856–1922), American baseball player
Sean McDermott (disambiguation), multiple people
Shane McDermott (born 1992), American football player
Stephen McDermott, Gaelic footballer
Steve McDermott (born 1964), English footballer

T
Tate McDermott (born 1998), Australian rugby union footballer
Terry McDermott (disambiguation), multiple people
Thomas McDermott (disambiguation), multiple people
Thomas A McDermott (born 1948) American Customs Official
Todd McDermott (born 1966), American journalist
Townsend McDermott (1818–1907), Australian politician
Tracey McDermott, British civil servant

U
Ufuoma McDermott (born 1981), Nigerian filmmaker

V
Vincent McDermott (1933–2016), American composer

W
Walsh McDermott (1909–1981), American physician
William McDermott (1930–2013), Irish-Peruvian Roman Catholic bishop

Z
Zara McDermott (born 1996), English media personality

See also
 
 McDermott Field, a baseball stadium in Idaho that was replaced by Melaleuca Field
MacDermot
MacDermott (disambiguation)
MacDiarmid
 

Anglicised Irish-language surnames
Patronymic surnames
Surnames from given names